The Franciscan Missionaries of Mary are a Roman Catholic centralized religious institute of consecrated life of Pontifical Right for women founded by Mother Mary of the Passion (born Hélène Marie Philippine de Chappotin de Neuville, 1839–1904) at Ootacamund, then British India, in 1877. The missionaries form an international religious congregation of women representing 79 nationalities spread over 74 countries on five continents.

Foundation 
Mary of the Passion, a novice of the Sisters of Mary Reparatrix, a congregation dedicated to the training of women in the spirit of Ignatius of Loyola, had been sent in 1865 from France to the apostolic vicariate of Madurai in British India, which was under the administration of the Society of Jesus. They had been requested to help train a native congregation of religious sisters. After her religious profession the following year, she was appointed the provincial superior of the houses of the congregation in that country.

A dissension in the ecclesiastical province which Mary had previously worked to resolve arose again. As a result, 20 of the sisters left the congregation, including Mary of the Passion. They gathered in a convent in Ootacamund, which Mary of the Passion had recently established. They formed a new community there under the authority of the local vicar apostolic.

These women resolved to form a new congregation, and Mary of the Passion traveled to Rome that November to seek permission for this from the Holy See. She obtained this from Pope Pius IX on 6 January 1877, under the name of Missionaries of Mary. Unlike the instruction focus of the Sisters of Mary Reparatrix, the missionaries would carry out a ministry of providing medical care to the women of India who were unable to receive it from male doctors, due to the practice of purdah, which strictly segregated them from contact with men. Mary of the Passion had seen the consequences and felt called to deal with the situation. As women themselves, they would have access to the parts of the home restricted to females.

The Sacred Congregation of the Propaganda Fide, which supervised all church activities in non-Catholic territories, suggested to her that she open a novitiate in her native France, to train recruits for the new congregation. In keeping with this, one was opened in Saint-Brieuc, and new vocations to the Missionaries came quickly.

Mary of the Passion had to return to Rome in 1880 to resolve issues about the new foundation. She had to make yet another voyage there in June 1882. This one was to be a turning point in the identity of the missionaries. Firstly, they were granted permission to open a house in Rome itself. Secondly, Mary of the Passion came into contact with Bernardino of Portogruaro, the Minister General of the Order of Friars Minor (The Franciscans). Under his guidance, on 4 October that year (the feast day of St. Francis of Assisi), she was admitted to the Third Order of St. Francis, which was a return to the Franciscan vocation to which she had felt called when she was briefly a candidate in a monastery of the Poor Clares early in her life. The new congregation formally adopted the Rule of the Franciscan Third Order Regular on 15 August 1885. At that time they took the name of Franciscan Missionaries of Mary.

Expansion 

The work of the Franciscan Missionaries quickly spread to other countries, including China. It was there, in 1900, that seven Franciscan Missionaries of Mary were murdered during the Boxer Rebellion, in which missionaries throughout that country were killed. These sisters were canonized in 2000 as among the Martyrs of China. The canonized sisters were:

  Marie-Hermine of Jesus (: Irma Grivot) 
 Marie de la Paix Giuliani (: Mary Ann Giuliani) 
Maria Chiara Nanetti (: Clelia Nanetti) 
Marie of Saint Natalie (: Joan Mary Kerguin) 
 Marie of Saint Just (: Ann Moreau) 
 Marie-Adolphine (: Ann Dierk) 
Mary Amandine (: Paula Jeuris) 

Maria Assunta Pallotta, who died in China in 1905, was beatified in 1954.

By the time of Mary of the Passion's death in 1904, there were 88 communities serving in 24 countries around the globe, serving a variety of services for women and children. There was a mission at Fantome Island, near Palm Island, Queensland as well as a leprosarium.

United States
In November 1903, seven sisters from Canada, Ireland and France arrived in Worcester, Massachusetts, in response to a request for sisters to minister among the many immigrant families from Canada. The following year, Bishop Matthew Harkins of the Diocese of Providence invited them to come to Woonsocket to serve families who worked in the mills.

In 1937 the Franciscan Missionaries of Mary assumed responsibility for the McMahon Memorial Temporary Shelter, where children forcibly removed from homes would be housed until more permanent situations could be found. This has now become McMahon Services for Children St. Francis Hospital in Flower Hill, New York, the only specialized cardiac care facility in New York, was founded by them in 1922. In Boston, Massachusetts, the Franciscan Missionaries accepted responsibility for the pediatric hospital founded in 1949 by Cardinal Richard Cushing, funded by Joseph P. Kennedy Sr., and his wife Rose. It is now known as Franciscan Children's.

Current status 
As of 2017, the Franciscan Missionaries of Mary formed the fifth largest religious institute for women in the Catholic Church, with 5,474 members serving in 74 countries. Medical care centers have been opened worldwide. Cardinal Hayes Home in Millbrook, New York has been sponsored by the FMM since 1941 It provides residential care and treatment for developmentally disabled children and young adults in its Millbrook location and in five community homes in Dutchess County. In 2018, the Catholic Extension Lumen Christi award was given to Sister Marie-Paule Willem, a Franciscan Missionary of Mary, serving in the Diocese of Las Cruces, New Mexico, honored a lifetime of missionary work.

Schools 
 Assunta Secondary School (SMK (P) Assunta), Petaling Jaya, Malaysia
Ave Maria College, Melbourne, Australia
Hai Sing Catholic School (formerly Hai Sing Girls' High School), Singapore
Holy Angels Anglo Indian Higher Secondary School, Chennai, India
Regina Pacis School, Jakarta/Bogor, Indonesia
Mater Dei School, New Delhi, India
Rosary Convent High School, Hyderabad, India
Rosary Matriculation Higher Secondary School, Chennai, India
Sacred Heart Girls' Higher Secondary School, Thanjavur, India
St Agnes Catholic High School, Sydney, Australia
Fatima Girls High School, Kazipet, India
St. Francis Anglo-Indian Girls School, Coimbatore, India
St. Lawrence's Girls' School, Karachi, Pakistan
Stella Maris College, Cubao/Oroquieta, Philippines
Stella Maris College, Chennai, Tamilnadu, India
Nazareth Convent High School, Ooty, Tamil Nadu, India
St. Rose of Lima’s College, Hong Kong, China
Collegio de Santa Rosa de Lima, Macau, China
St Mary's Missionaries Franciscan School, Damascus, Syria
St. Joseph Academy of Sariaya, Quezon,[Sariaya, Quezon]], Philippines

Institutions 
Assunta Hospital, Petaling Jaya, Malaysia
St. Francis Hospital, New York, United States
Franciscan Children's, Boston, United States
St. Joseph's Hospital, Baramulla, India

References

External links 
Official Website

 
Religious organizations established in 1877
Congregations of Franciscan sisters
Franciscan missionary orders
Catholic religious institutes established in the 19th century
Catholic female orders and societies
Catholic nursing orders
1877 establishments in British India